Listeria cornellensis is a species of bacteria. It is a Gram-positive, facultatively anaerobic, non-motile, non-spore-forming bacillus. It is non-pathogenic. The species was named after Cornell University, and its discovery was first published in 2014.

Listeria cornellensis is phenotypically similar to Listeria grandensis, but is genetically distinct.

References

External links
Type strain of Listeria cornellensis at BacDive -  the Bacterial Diversity Metadatabase

cornellensis
Bacteria described in 2014